José Durán may refer to:

 José Durán (boxer) (born 1945), Spanish boxer
 Jose Duran (designer), Dominican-born American fashion designer
 José Durán (Spanish footballer) (born 1974), Spanish footballer
 José Durán (swimmer) (born 1951), Spanish swimmer
 José Antonio Duran (born 1946), Mexican boxer
 José Antonio Durán (c. 1810–1880s), Argentine military officer and politician
 José María Pasquini Durán (1939–2010), Argentine journalist

See also
 Josep Antoni Duran i Lleida (born 1952), Spanish politician